LA-6 is a constituency of Azad Kashmir Legislative Assembly which is currently represented by the Chaudhary Ali Shan Soni of Pakistan Tehreek-e-Insaf. It covers the area of Samahni Tehsil in Bhimber District of Azad Kashmir, Pakistan.

Election 2016

elections were held in this constituency on 21 July 2016.

Bhimber District
Azad Kashmir Legislative Assembly constituencies